was a town located in Toyoura District, Yamaguchi Prefecture, Japan.

As of 2003, the town had an estimated population of 6,581 and a density of 40.26 persons per km². The total area was 163.47 km².

On February 13, 2005, Toyota, along with the towns of Hōhoku, Kikugawa and Toyoura (all from Toyoura District), was merged into the expanded city of Shimonoseki.

As suggested by the presence of a local museum and a summer festival, Toyota is renowned for its firefly population, which makes an appearance for a short time during the month of June.

External links
Toyota official website (in Japanese)

Dissolved municipalities of Yamaguchi Prefecture